2016–17 Vijay Hazare Trophy is the 15th season of the Vijay Hazare Trophy, a List A cricket tournament in India. It will be contested by 28 domestic cricket teams of India.

Points table

Fixtures

Round 1

Round 2

Round 3

Round 4

Round 5

Round 6

Round 7

References 

List A cricket competitions
Domestic cricket competitions in 2016–17